Zhang Li (born 26 June 1961) is a former track and field athlete from China, who competed for her native country in the women's javelin throw event. She was a gold medallist at the 1990 Asian Games and the 1993 Asian Athletics Championships.

Zhang twice competed for Asia at the IAAF World Cup and was a silver medallist in 1989. She represented her home area of Tianjin at the 1993 National Games of China and was runner-up to Ha Xiaoyan.

International competitions

References

1961 births
Living people
Athletes from Tianjin
Chinese female javelin throwers
Asian Games gold medalists for China
Asian Games medalists in athletics (track and field)
Athletes (track and field) at the 1990 Asian Games
Medalists at the 1990 Asian Games
Japan Championships in Athletics winners